The Chad Cultural Centre is an institution located in Mao, Chad.  It was founded by the government in order to foster national traditions.

Notes and references 

Chadian culture
Buildings and structures in Chad